Una donna per amico (A woman as friend) is an album by the Italian singer and songwriter Lucio Battisti. It was released in December 1978 by Numero Uno.

The album was Italy's fourth best-selling album in 1978.

It appears at 3rd place in the 100 greatest Italian albums of all time list published in 2012 by Italian edition of Rolling Stone magazine.

The album was recorded at The Manor Studio in Oxfordshire and London with producer Geoff Westley and professional British session musicians.

Track listing
All lyrics written by Mogol, all music composed by Lucio Battisti.
 "Prendila così" (Take It As It Comes) – 7:48
 "Donna selvaggia donna" (Lady) – 4:39
 "Aver paura d'innamorarsi troppo" (Afraid of Falling) – 5:49
 "Perché no" (Day to Day) – 5:44
 "Nessun dolore" (Pain is Gone) – 6:15
 "Una donna per amico" (A Woman as a Friend) – 5:19
 "Maledetto gatto" (Damned Cat) – 4:21
 "Al cinema" (Let's Go See a Movie) – 4:36

References

1978 albums
Lucio Battisti albums